Baghdad or Bust is a budget documentary, filmed in Canada, Turkey, Kurdistan, Iraq, Israel, Palestine, Jordan, and Washington, D.C. During the US-led 2003 invasion of Iraq, Baghdad or Bust was an official selection at several Film Festivals including Hot Docs, the Bergen Film Festival in Norway and it received the top award for Best Documentary at the 2003 Whistler Film Festival. Baghdad or Bust was described as a funny, poignant take on the war in Iraq, chronicling the misadventures of Gordon and two fellow Yellowknifers as they meander through the Middle East during the U.S. invasion, interviewing such stranger-than-fictional characters as a piratical Kurd and a Turkish rug-monger with a cat named Bush. Armed with a microphone, director Matt Frame's self-effacing and sardonic wit wins the day with his parody of Michael Moore's filmmaking style. "

See also
List of Iraq War documentaries

References

External links
 
 

2004 films
Documentary films about the Iraq War
Canadian documentary films
2004 documentary films
2000s English-language films
2000s Canadian films